Valea Socilor River may refer to:
 Valea Socilor, a tributary of the Șușița in Gorj County, Romania
 Valea Socilor, a tributary of the Vasilatu in Vâlcea County, Romania